Pear VC (prior name Pejman Mar) is a seed-stage venture firm based in Menlo Park, California. It was founded by Pejman Nozad and Mar Hershenson in 2013. Pear VC works with early-stage companies. The company was originally based in Palo Alto, California before relocating to Menlo Park.

History 
The company launched under the name Pejman Mar Ventures, in 2013.

Prior to founding the company, Hershenson had founded software companies Barcelona Design, Sabio Labs, and Revel Touch. Nozad had served as a sports journalist, radio host, professional soccer player, and rug salesman before founding going into venture capital.

In 2015, Pejman Mar sponsored a $250,000 startup competition at UC Berkeley. Over time, the company has also sponsored fellowship and entrepreneurship programs under the name “Pear Dorm” at other educational institutions such as Stanford University, Harvard University, and MIT.

Pejman Mar rebranded as Pear VC in 2016. Pear VC was one of the companies backing DoorDash prior to its launch. Other companies Pear VC has supported include Guardant Health, Gusto, Polarr and Branch.

For their work with Pear VC, Hershenson was ranked number 29 and Nozad was ranked 15 on Forbes’ 2021 Midas List. The following year, Nozad was named number 2 on Forbes’ 2022 Midas Seed List and number 15 on the regular Midas List, while Hershenson was ranked number 30 on the Midas List.

In 2022, Matt Birnbaum, former head of talent acquisition at Instacart, joined Pear VC as its head of talent.

Pear VC mainly works with startups in their earliest stages, such as pre-seed and seed-stage companies. Pear VC uses a two-pronged structure in which it houses both a venture investing arm and an accelerator.

References 

Venture capital firms of the United States
American companies established in 2013
Companies based in Menlo Park, California
Financial services companies established in 2013